Valtournenche is a town and comune in the Aosta Valley region of north-western Italy,  above the sea level. It is named after and covers most of the Valtournenche, a valley on the left side of the Dora Baltea, from Châtillon to the Matterhorn. Valtournenche is close to Cervinia and in winter the two towns are connected also with the ski slopes. In fact, they are part of the same ski resort with also Zermatt, Switzerland.

History

Notable people
 Jean-Antoine Carrel (1829–1890), mountain climber
 Jean-Joseph Maquignaz (1829–1890), mountain climber
 Georges Carrel (1800–1870), canon, mountain climber and botanist
 Luigi Carrel (1901–1983), mountain climber
 Piero Maquignaz, skier and mountain climber

References

Cities and towns in Aosta Valley